The Beumer Group GmbH & Co. KG, based in Beckum, Germany, is an international manufacturer of intralogistics systems. The company has branches in around 70 countries. The products include conveyor systems, palletising technology, packaging technology and sorting and distribution systems.
 
Bernhard Beumer founded the company in 1935. In 1977 Beumer expanded to the USA (Beumer Corporation), in 1983 to Australia (Beumer Australia, in Adelaide) and in 1993 to South America (Beumer Latinoamericana Equipamentos Ltda. in Campinas, Brazil). The company is headed by Christoph Beumer, grandson of Bernhard Beumer senior, since 2000. On 28 August 2009, Beumer took over all shares of Crisplant a/s, based in Aarhus, Denmark, from the previous owner, Melrose Plc. In 2011, Beumer took over Enexco Teknologies India Limited. In May 2022, it was announced Beumer had acquired the Magdeburg-headquartered supplier of conveying systems and loading technology, FAM GmbH.

References

External links 
 Official Website
 

Companies of Germany